Aesthetics and Morality is a 2007 book by Elisabeth Schellekens, in which the author provides an account of the main ideas and debates at the intersection of aesthetics and moral philosophy.

References

External links
Aesthetics and Morality

2007 non-fiction books
Bloomsbury Publishing books
Aesthetics books
Ethics books